Ukraine competed at the 2020 Summer Paralympics in Tokyo, Japan, from 24 August to 5 September 2021. This was their seventh consecutive appearance at the Summer Paralympics since 1996.

Medalists

Archery 

Ukraine collected two quota places (one male, one female) at the 2019 Para Archery World Championships held in Den Bosch, Netherlands.

Athletics

Mykyta Senyk, Ihor Tsvietov, Roman Pavlyk, Oleksandr Doroshenko, Leilia Adzhametova and Oxana Boturchuk are among the Ukrainian athletes who qualified for the 2020 Summer Paralympics.
Men's track

Men's field

Women's track

Women's field

Badminton

Cycling

Ukraine competed in cycling at the 2020 Summer Paralympics.

Goalball

Men

Group stage

Quarter-finals

Judo

Rowing

Ukraine qualified four boats in all events into the Paralympic regatta. They are qualify after successfully entering the top eight at the 2019 World Rowing Championships in Ottensheim, Austria.

Qualification Legend: FA=Final A (medal); FB=Final B (non-medal); R=Repechage

Shooting

The following athletes qualified for the 2020 Summer Paralympics after their results at the 2018 World Shooting Para Sport Championships:

 Iryna Liakhu
 Oleksii Denysiuk
 Andrii Doroshenko
 Iryna Shchetnik
 Vitali Plakushchyi
 Yurii Stoiev
 Vasyl Kovalchuk

Swimming

Ukraine qualified 40 athletes.

Table tennis

Ukraine entered eight athletes into the table tennis competition at the games. Viktor Didukh qualified from 2019 ITTF European Para Championships which was held in Helsingborg, Sweden and seven other via World Ranking allocation.

Men

Women

Taekwondo

Para taekwondo makes its debut appearance in the Paralympic programme. Anton Shvets, Viktoriia Marchuk, & Yuliya Lypetska, qualified for the 2020 Summer Paralympics via World Ranking.

Men

Women

See also
 Ukraine at the Paralympics
 Ukraine at the 2020 Summer Olympics

References

External links
 2020 Summer Paralympics website

Nations at the 2020 Summer Paralympics
2020
Summer Paralympics